What would have been the first USS Metomkin (AVP-47) was a proposed United States Navy seaplane tender that was never laid down.

Construction and commissioning 
Metomkin was to have been one of 41 Barnegat-class small seaplane tenders the U.S. Navy planned to commission during the early 1940s, and was to have been built at Houghton, Washington, by the Lake Washington Shipyard. However, by the spring of 1943 the Navy deemed that number of seaplane tenders excess to requirements, and decided to complete four of them as motor torpedo boat tenders and one as a catapult training ship.  In addition, the Navy also decided to cancel six of the Barnegat-class ships prior to their construction, freeing up the diesel engines that would have powered them for use in escort vessels and amphibious landing craft.

AVP-47 was assigned the name Metomkin on 23 August 1942. However, she became one of the final two ships to be cancelled when the Navy cancelled the contract for her construction on 29 April 1943 before construction could begin.

References 
 
 NavSource Online: Service Ship Photo Archive Small Seaplane Tender (AVP) Index

 

World War II auxiliary ships of the United States
Barnegat-class seaplane tenders
Cancelled ships of the United States Navy
Ships built at Lake Washington Shipyard